Marco Del Lungo (born 1 March 1990) is a water polo player from Italy. He was part of the Italian team at the 2016 Summer Olympics, where the team won the bronze medal.

Honours

Club
Brescia
LEN Euro Cup: 2015–16
Serie A1: 2020–21
Coppa Italia: 2011–12

Pro Recco
LEN Champions League: 2021–22

 LEN Super Cup: 2021, 2022
Serie A: 2021–22
Coppa Italia: 2021–22

Awards
Member of the World Team by total-waterpolo: 2019

See also
 Italy men's Olympic water polo team records and statistics
 List of Olympic medalists in water polo (men)
 List of men's Olympic water polo tournament goalkeepers
 List of world champions in men's water polo
 List of World Aquatics Championships medalists in water polo

References

External links
 

1990 births
Living people
Sportspeople from the Province of Viterbo
Italian male water polo players
Water polo goalkeepers
Water polo players at the 2016 Summer Olympics
Medalists at the 2016 Summer Olympics
Olympic bronze medalists for Italy in water polo
Water polo players at the 2020 Summer Olympics
World Aquatics Championships medalists in water polo
21st-century Italian people